The following is a list of the first woman to serve as mayor of their respective municipalities.

1730s 
1734
Madame Malotteau, first woman to execute the office of mayor of Namur, Belgium 
Her husband served as mayor and following his death his colleagues requested she take over the mayoral duties.

1860s 
1862
Nancy Smith, first woman elected mayor in the United States in Oskaloosa, Iowa, United States  but declined to serve as mayor.

1880s 

1887
Susanna M. Salter, the first woman to serve as mayor in United States as mayor of Argonia, Kansas, United States 

1888
Mary D. Lowman, the first woman elected mayor of Oskaloosa, Kansas, United States 
She served alongside the first all-woman city council in the United States. They were all re-elected in 1889.

1889
America L. King, first woman mayor of Elk Falls, Kansas, United States 
Ella Miller, first woman mayor of Rossville, Kansas, United States 
Wilhelmina Morgan, first woman mayor of Cottonwood Falls, Kansas, United States 
Lucy Sullivan, the first woman mayor of Baldwin City, Kansas, United States

1890s 

1890
Belle Gray, first woman mayor of Canton, Kansas, United States 

1891
Mary E. Paxton, first woman mayor of Kiowa, Kansas, United States 
Elizabeth Vedder, first woman mayor of Haddam, Kansas, United States 

1893
Elizabeth Yates, first woman mayor in the British Empire and first female mayor of Onehunga, New Zealand 
Emma J. Barnes, elected the first woman mayor of Geuda Springs, Kansas, United States .
Smith, first woman mayor of Wamego, Kansas, United States 

1894
Anna Austin, the first woman mayor of Pleasanton, Kansas, United States  [population approx., 1,500]
1895
Alice E. Burns, first woman mayor of Florence, Oregon, United States 
Burns was also the first woman elected in the state of Oregon. Women were elected to all other town offices as well.
Antoinette L. Haskell, the first woman mayor of Gaylord, Kansas, United States 

1896
Clara A. Curtis, the first woman mayor of Cimarron, Kansas, United States 
May Burbank Wade, the first woman mayor of Ellis, Kansas, United States 
Wade served with an all-woman municipal government.

1897
Anna M. Strain, the first woman mayor of Jamestown, Kansas, United States 

1898
Jesse Parker, first woman mayor of Kendrick, Idaho, United States 
also the first woman mayor in the state of Idaho.

1899
Elizabeth Totten, first woman mayor of Beattie, Kansas, United States

See also 

 List of first women governors and/or chief ministers
 List of first women mayors
 List of first women mayors (20th century)
 List of first women mayors (21st century)
 List of first women mayors in the United States
 List of the first female holders of political offices
 Women in government

References

Lists of mayors
Mayors
Mayors
Women's history by century